Bartosz Szeliga (born 10 January 1993) is a Polish professional footballer who plays as a full-back for ŁKS Łódź in the I liga.

References

External links
 
 
 

1993 births
Living people
Polish footballers
Poland youth international footballers
Association football midfielders
Ekstraklasa players
I liga players
Sandecja Nowy Sącz players
Piast Gliwice players
Bruk-Bet Termalica Nieciecza players
GKS Tychy players
ŁKS Łódź players
Sportspeople from Nowy Sącz